Major Ronald Anderson Gerrard (26 January 1912 – 22 January 1943) was an English rugby union international. He also played first-class cricket for Somerset.

Gerrard was a member of two successful Home Nations campaigns with England in 1932 and 1934, the latter a Triple Crown. The Hong Kong born centre played a Test against South Africa when they toured Britain in 1932 and in a win over New Zealand, who toured the British Isles and Canada in 1936.

In addition to his rugby career, Gerrard played three first-class matches, as a batsman, with Somerset in the 1935 County Championship. He did not affect any of the matches, amassing just 36 runs from his five innings.

A Major in the Royal Engineers during World War II, Gerrard fought in North Africa and was killed in action near Tobruk.

References

External links
Cricinfo: Ronald Gerrard

1912 births
1943 deaths
British Army personnel killed in World War II
English rugby union players
England international rugby union players
English cricketers
Rugby union centres
Somerset cricketers
Royal Engineers officers
Companions of the Distinguished Service Order